Events from the year 1878 in Russia.

Incumbents
 Monarch – Alexander II

Events

  Treaty of Berlin (1878)
  Bestuzhev Courses
  Kars Oblast
  Stieglitz Museum of Applied Arts
 Russo-Turkish War
 Treaty of San Stefano

Births

 Joseph Stalin, Soviet statesman.

Deaths

References

1878 in Russia
Years of the 19th century in the Russian Empire